Small for gestational age (SGA) newborns are those who are smaller in size than normal for the gestational age, most commonly defined as a weight below the 10th percentile for the gestational age.

Causes
Being small for gestational age is broadly either:
 Being constitutionally small, wherein the state is basically a genetic trait of the baby.
 Intrauterine growth restriction, also called "pathological SGA"

Diagnosis
The condition is determined by birth weight and/or length.

A related condition, intrauterine growth restriction, is generally diagnosed by measuring the mother's uterus, with the fundal height being less than it should be for that stage of the pregnancy. If it is suspected, the mother will usually be sent for an ultrasound to confirm.

Management
Ninety percent of babies born SGA catch up in growth by the time they reach 2 years old. However, all SGA babies should be watched for signs of failure to thrive, hypoglycemia and other conditions common to SGA babies (see below). Hypoglycemia is common in asymmetrical SGA babies because their larger brains burn calories at a faster rate than their usually limited fat stores hold. Hypoglycemia is treated by frequent feedings and/or additions of cornstarch-based products (such as Duocal powder) to the feedings. For the 10 percent of those that are SGA without catchup growth by 2 years old, an endocrinologist should be consulted. Some cases warrant growth hormone therapy. There are some common conditions and disorders found in many that are SGA (and especially those that are SGA without catchup growth by 2 years old). They should be treated by the appropriate specialist:
 Gastroenterologist - for gastrointestinal issues such as: reflux and/or delayed gastric emptying
 Dietitian - to address caloric deficits. Dietitians are usually brought in for cases that include failure to thrive. Also, according to the theory of thrifty phenotype, causes of growth restriction also trigger epigenetic responses in the fetus that are otherwise activated in times of chronic food shortage. If the offspring actually develops in an environment rich in food it may be more prone to metabolic disorders, such as obesity and type II diabetes.
 Speech-language pathologist or occupational therapist - for feeding issues. Occupational therapists may also treat sensory issues
 Behaviorist - for feeding issues, a behavioral approach may also be used, but usually for older children (over 2)
 Allergist - to diagnose or rule out food allergies (not necessarily more common in those SGA than the normal population)
 Ear, nose and throat doctor - to diagnose enlarged adenoids or tonsils (not necessarily more common in those SGA than the normal population)
For intrauterine growth restriction (during pregnancy), possible treatments include the early induction of labor, though this is only done if the condition has been diagnosed and seen as a risk to the health of the fetus.

Terminology
By definition, at least 10% of all newborns will be labeled SGA. Not all newborns that are SGA are pathologically growth restricted and, in fact, may be constitutionally small. However, the designation has prognostic importance because it predicts susceptibility to hypoglycemia, hypothermia, and polycythemia.

If small for gestational age babies have been the subject of intrauterine growth restriction, formerly known as intrauterine growth retardation, the term "SGA associated with intrauterine growth restriction" is used.
Intrauterine growth restriction refers to a condition in which a fetus is unable to achieve its genetically determined potential size. This functional definition seeks to identify a population of fetuses at risk for modifiable but otherwise poor outcomes. This definition intentionally excludes fetuses that are small for gestational age (SGA) but are not pathologically small. Infants born SGA with severe short stature (or severe SGA) are defined as having a length less than 2.5 standard deviation scores below the mean.

A related term is low birth weight, defined as an infant with a birth weight (that is, mass at the time of birth) of less than 2500 g (5 lb 8 oz), regardless of gestational age at the time of birth.
Other related terms include "very low birth weight", which is less than 1500 g, and "extremely low birth weight", which is less than 1000 g. Normal Weight at term delivery is 2500 g - 4200 g.

SGA is not a synonym of low birth weight, very low birth weight, or extremely low birth weight.
Example: 35-week gestational age delivery, 2250 g weight is appropriate for gestational age but is still low birth weight. One third of low-birth-weight neonates - infants weighing less than 2500 g - are small for gestational age.

There is an 8.1% incidence of low birth weight in developed countries, and 6–30% in developing countries.  Much of this can be attributed to the health of the mother during pregnancy. One third of babies born with a low birth weight are also small for gestational age. Infants that are born at low birth weights are at risk of developing neonatal infection.

Both low and high maternal serum Vitamin D (25-OH) are associated with higher incidence SGA in white women, although the correlation does not seem to hold for African American women.

References

External links 

Disorders related to length of gestation and fetal growth
Neonatology